Scott Geoffrion (May 18, 1965 – May 8, 2006) was an NHRA drag racing driver. He was a former two-time Pro Stock World Championship runner-up and a nine-time national event winner. He died on May 8, 2006 of an apparent heart attack in Irvine, California. Geoffrion reached the final round 28 times in his career that spanned more than 200 races from 1987 through 2004. He didn't score his first victory until his 10th final round, in Memphis in 1993, where he defeated Pro Stock legend Bob Glidden.

ESPN's obituary listed him as "a character, a charmer, and a drag racer who wanted to enjoy himself as much as he wanted to win."

Career
In 1987, Geoffrion began his Pro Stock career as a team driver for Warren Johnson, but it wasn't long before Geoffrion's talents were recognized and he was offered a factory car alongside Darrell Alderman.

Throughout the early 1990s, Geoffrion and his Team Mopar teammate, Darrell Alderman, generated an aura throughout the sport. Alderman and Geoffrion became known as "The Dodge Boys" and Mopar's Pro Stock hinged on that brand for the next several years. During that time, Alderman added two more championships to his 1991 title while Geoffrion provided Mopar with a formidable 1-2 punch that resulted in his two runner-up points finishes in 1992 and 1994 (career-high six wins). Geoffrion logged a career six top 10 finishes.

The two racers gave Mopar a hip, youthful image that complemented the company's performance marketing strategies. Geoffrion and Alderman could be seen at every national event talking to fans, signing autographs, and amplifying their "Butch and Sundance" personas with fan-friendly humor and gregarious attitudes. It was a high-water mark for Chrysler's modern day Pro Stock battle plan and Geoffrion was a perfect fit.

Geoffrion sat out the 2001 season after being released from the Dodge camp following three lackluster seasons but resurfaced in a Ford with new team owner Hurley Blakeney of Nitro Fish Racing and scored his final top 10 finish in 2003, a season in which he was runner-up twice.

Geoffrion was the Vice-President for National Electronic Alloys, Inc. of Santa Ana, California up until his death at the age of 40.

Records

In September 1992, Geoffrion became the first NHRA Pro Stock competitor to break the 7.10 second mark when he completed a 7.099-second pass at Maple Grove Raceway in Mohnton, Pennsylvania.
On October 7, 2000, Geoffrion set an NHRA Pro Stock record in his B1 wedge-powered Dodge R/T. He passed through the Memphis Motorsports Park timing lights at a record-shattering 6.809-second elapsed time during qualifying for the 13th annual AutoZone Nationals.  The following day he officially backed up the national record with a run of 6.868 secs. in his first-round victory over teammate Darrell Alderman The historic pass eclipsed Warren Johnson's 6.822-second effort set Oct. 23, 1999 at the Texas Motorplex in Ennis.

References

1965 births
2006 deaths
Sportspeople from Barnstable County, Massachusetts
Dragster drivers
Racing drivers from Massachusetts
People from Yarmouth, Massachusetts